The Eastern / Greek Orthodox Bible (EOB) is an incomplete English language edition of the Bible published and controlled by Greek Orthodox Christians with limited copyright control and within a collaborative framework, independent from non-Orthodox commercial publishers and benefiting from the input from Eastern Orthodox scholars and theologians.

Unlike other versions, the EOB provides over 200 pages of introductory material and appendices, including articles by the late Protopresbyter George Florovsky and Miltiades Konstantinou of the Aristotle University of Thessaloniki. The main purpose of the EOB is to provide an accurate and easy-to-read English text of the Bible that is suitable for use by Orthodox Christian communities and individuals, while providing an outstanding text for scholars.

New Testament 
The New Testament is completed and available. Its text is based on the official ecclesiastical text published in 1904 by the Ecumenical Patriarchate of Constantinople, while documenting all significant variants to the critical text, Majority Text, and Textus Receptus. It also provides extensive footnotes and appendices dealing with significant verses (such as Matthew 16:18 and John 1:1, 1:18, and 15:26). The Patriarchal Text was selected on Mount Athos from among a large number of reliable ecclesiastical manuscripts and appears to be in large part identical or similar to Minuscule 1495 (KR subgroup).

Old Testament 
The Old Testament was not completed but was planned to have been based on the Greek text of the Old Testament Septuagint with all major Masoretic and Dead Sea Scroll variants documented in the footnotes. For reasons documented in the comprehensive introductory section, the EOB would also have provided the Hebrew/Masoretic versions of Job, Jeremiah and Esther.

Editions Using the EOB Translation
 EOB: The Eastern / Greek Orthodox New Testament (CreateSpace Independent Publishing Platform, 2013)
 The Holy Gospel (Saint Ignatius Orthodox Press, 2018)
 EOB New Testament: Portable Edition (Newrome Press, 2019)
 The Holy Apostle (Saint Ignatius Orthodox Press, 2019)

See also

References

External links 
 Eastern Greek Orthodox Bible: New Testament (pdf; some pages missing)

Bible translations into English
Christian terminology